The Croatia national under-18 football team represents Croatia in football matches for players aged 18 or under. The team played its first match, a friendly against Slovenia in 1993.

Current squad 

 The following players were called up for the friendly match.
 Match dates: 6, 10 and 13 June 2022
 Opposition: ,  and 
 Caps and goals correct as of:''' 24 March 2022, after the match against

References

See also 

 Croatia men's national football team
 Croatia men's national football B team
 Croatia men's national under-23 football team
 Croatia men's national under-21 football team
 Croatia men's national under-20 football team
 Croatia men's national under-19 football team
 Croatia men's national under-17 football team
 Croatia men's national under-16 football team
 Croatia men's national under-15 football team
 Croatia women's national football team
 Croatia women's national under-19 football team
 Croatia women's national under-17 football team

under-18
European national under-18 association football teams
Youth football in Croatia